Sarbaz (also Romanized as Sarbāz) is a village in Padena-ye Olya Rural District, Padena District, Semirom County, Isfahan Province, Iran. The 2006 census counted 310 residents, belonging to 66 families.

References 

Populated places in Semirom County